James Bethune (July 7, 1840 – December 18, 1884) was an Ontario lawyer and political figure. He represented Stormont in the Legislative Assembly of Ontario as a Liberal member from 1872 to 1879.

He was born in Glengarry County in Upper Canada in 1840. He studied at Queen's College and University College. He articled in law, was called to the bar in 1862 and opened a practice in Cornwall. In 1865, he was named County Crown Attorney for Stormont, Dundas and Glengarry. He was called to the Quebec bar in 1869. He was elected to the 2nd Parliament of Ontario for Stormont in an 1872 by-election and was reelected in 1875. In 1870, he moved to Toronto and formed a law firm with Edward Blake and James Kirkpatrick Kerr. He retired from politics in 1879.

External links 

1840 births
1884 deaths
Ontario Liberal Party MPPs
People from the United Counties of Stormont, Dundas and Glengarry